Nikolay Alexandrovich Bestuzhev (Russian: Николай Александрович Бестужев; 13 April 1791, Saint Petersburg – 27 May 1855, Novoselenginsk) was a Russian Navy officer, writer, inventor and portrait artist; associated with the Decembrist revolt.

Biography 
He was born to a noble family. His father, was a writer and government councilor.

He entered the Sea Cadet Corps school in 1802 and graduated in 1809. While there, he audited classes taught by Andrey Voronikhin at the Imperial Academy of Arts. In 1810, he became a Lieutenant in the Corps. In 1815, he participated in naval actions in the Netherlands. He was appointed an Assistant Superintendent for the Baltic lighthouse in Kronstadt in 1820. Two years later, he reorganized the lithography department at the Admiralty, for which he was awarded the Order of Saint Vladimir, and began writing a history of the fleet. 

In 1824, he was promoted to Lieutenant-Commander and, shortly after, was named Director of the Admiralty's museum, where he was known as "The Mummy". During this time he also contributed to the journals Polar Star (edited by his brother, Alexander) and Syn otechestva (Son of the Fatherland). He also served with the Bureau of Censorship and, in 1825, became a member of the Imperial Society for the Encouragement of the Arts.

These achievements were short-lived, however. Since 1824, he had been a member of the "", a secret organization headed by Kondraty Ryleyev, and had written a "Manifesto to the Russian People". Following the Decembrist riot on Peter's Square, during which he led a unit of rebellious Naval Equipage of the Guard, he went into hiding but was found and arrested. He was taken to the Peter and Paul Fortress and, on 10 July 1826, was convicted of engaging in subversive activities and mutiny. He was sentenced to katorga (hard labor) for life.

Life in Siberia
The following month, he and his brother Mikhail were taken to Shlisselburg Fortress. In September 1827, they were transferred to Siberia and placed in a special prison at the confluence of the Chita and Ingoda rivers. In 1830, they were moved again, into the town of Petrovsk-Zabaykalsky. In 1832, their terms were reduced to fifteen years. Shortly after, he entered into a common-law marriage and had two children; one of whom was Alexey Startsev, a major figure in the commercial trade between Russia and China. The year 1839 found him and his brother transferred to Novoselenginsk, where he chose to remain; dying there in 1855. 

Despite the harsh conditions, he painted numerous portraits of his fellow Decembrists, the family members who had followed them there and local villagers; at first in watercolor, later in oils. At the end of his term, he spent 1841 in Irkutsk, doing portraits of government officials.

He was also engaged as a cobbler, lathe operator and watchmaker. In that capacity, he developed a design for a high-precision chronometer based on a "new system" which he never revealed. During the Crimean War, he designed a gun lock. He also made meteorological and astronomical observations, created an irrigation system, bred sheep, found a new coal deposit and collected Buryat folk tales.

In 1973, the playwright  wrote a drama about Bestuzhev called Гражданин России (A Citizen of Russia). The 1990 feature-length film,  (No Foreign Land) is based on his life in Siberia.

Available writings 
 Mark Azadovsky (ed.), Воспоминания Бестужевых (memoirs), "Literary Monuments" series, USSR Academy of Sciences, 1951, reissued 2005 (896 pgs.)  
 S. F. Koval (ed.), Сочинения и письма, (writings and letters), Decembrist Memorial Museum, Irkutsk, 2003
 Bayr Dugarov (ed.), Гусиное озеро: статьи, очерк (Goose Lake; ethnographic writings), Buryat Publishing House, 1991
 Опыт истории Российского флота (History of the Russian Navy), Admiral Makarov National University of Shipbuilding, 1961

Selected portraits

References

Further reading 
 Ilya Silberstein, Художник-декабрист Николай Бестужев (Artist-Decembrist, Nikolay Bestuzhev), Изобразительное искусство, 1988

External links 

Selected writings of Bestuzhev online @ Lib.ru "Классика"
Another brief biography @ ViewMap
Nikolay Bestuzhev @ 360Baikal

1791 births
1855 deaths
Painters from the Russian Empire
Portrait painters
Watercolorists
Decembrists
Imperial Russian Navy personnel
Naval historians
Writers from the Russian Empire
Memoirists from the Russian Empire
Internal exiles from the Russian Empire
Inventors from the Russian Empire
Ethnographers from the Russian Empire
Recipients of the Order of St. Vladimir
19th-century memoirists
Prisoners of Shlisselburg fortress
Prisoners of the Peter and Paul Fortress
Military personnel from Saint Petersburg
Naval Cadet Corps alumni